David Timothy Clark (born July 15, 1986) is an American politician. He is a member of the Georgia House of Representatives from the 100th District, serving since 2015. Clark has sponsored 159 bills. He is a member of the Republican Party. In June 2022, Clark gained attention after beating the Majority Caucus Chairwoman, Bonnie Rich, with 59.25% of the vote.

Representative Clark is a graduate of the Gwinnett Leadership Institute. He and his wife, Courtney, have a daughter, Madison, and a son, Miles. They are involved in their church and live in Sugar Hill.

References

Republican Party members of the Georgia House of Representatives
21st-century American politicians
Living people
1986 births